Boz Qurd Samukh FK was an Azerbaijani football club from Samukh founded in 1990, as Kür Samux. They finished second in the 1992 Azerbaijan First Division, gaining promotion to the 1993 Azerbaijan Top Division, where they changed their name to Boz Qurd Samukh for their only season, as they finished 9th in Group B, and dissolved at the end of the same season.

League and domestic cup history

References 

Boz Qurd Samukh
Association football clubs established in 1990
Defunct football clubs in Azerbaijan
Association football clubs disestablished in 1993